The 2019–20 North Dakota State Bison men's basketball team represented North Dakota State University in the 2019–20 NCAA Division I men's basketball season. The Bison, led by sixth-year head coach David Richman, played their home games at the Scheels Center in Fargo, North Dakota as members of the Summit League. They finished the season 25–8, 13–3 in Summit League play to finish in a tie for the Summit League regular season championship. They defeated Denver, Oral Roberts, and North Dakota to become champions of the 2020 Summit League tournament. They earned the Summit League's automatic bid to the NCAA tournament, however, the tournament was cancelled amid the COVID-19 pandemic.

Previous season
The Bison finished the season 19-16, 9-7 in Summit League play to finish in a tie for third place. They defeated Oral Roberts in the quarterfinals, Western Illinois in the semifinals, and Omaha to win the Summit League tournament, and obtained a 16 seed in the East regional of the 2019 NCAA Division I men's basketball tournament. In the First Four, they defeated North Carolina Central before losing to the number 1 overall seeded Duke.

Roster

Schedule and results

|-
!colspan=9 style=| Exhibition

|-
!colspan=9 style=| Regular season

|-
!colspan=9 style=| The Summit League tournament

Source

Notes

References

North Dakota State Bison men's basketball seasons
North Dakota State
Bison
Bison